Zaburunnoye is a rural locality (a selo) in Biryuchekosinsky Selsoviet, Limansky District, Astrakhan Oblast, Russia. The population was 109 as of 2010. There are 4 streets.

Geography 
Zaburunnoye is located 32 km southeast of Liman (the district's administrative centre) by road. Biryuchya Kosa is the nearest rural locality.

References 

Rural localities in Limansky District